Palonín is a municipality and village in Šumperk District in the Olomouc Region of the Czech Republic. It has about 400 inhabitants.

Notable people
Stanislav Lolek (1873–1936), painter and illustrator

References

Villages in Šumperk District